The Runner is a 1962 Australian television play written by Alan Seymour which screened on ATN 7.

Cast
Lew Luton
Reg Lye
Brian Anderson as the ex-trainer

Production
A copy of the script was sent to Herb Elliott to see if he would take offence. He wrote back saying he approved of the play.

In January 1961 it was announced the play had been filmed.

Reception
It aired on Wednesday 24 October 1962 at 8 pm as part of a series of programs called By Special Request.

The critic for the Sydney Morning Herald wrote that the play "exemplified his [Seymour's] gift for finding subjects of universal potential combined with a central relevance to Australian occupations..."The Runner" promised well by taking as its central character a young Australian athlete rigorously trained to achieve fame far outdistancing his personal readiness for it."

References

Australian television plays
Australian Broadcasting Corporation original programming
English-language television shows